Aquatic House Party is a 1950 short film produced by Jack Eaton, part of the Grantland Rice Sportlights series. It won an Oscar for Best Short Subject (One-Reel) at the 22nd Academy Awards in 1949. It featured Helen Morgan.

References

External links

1950 films
1950 short films
American black-and-white films
American short films
Live Action Short Film Academy Award winners
Paramount Pictures short films
1950s English-language films